Perennial: Songs for the Seasons of Life is the twelfth studio and second praise and worship album by Christian singer-songwriter Twila Paris, released on March 24, 1998 by Sparrow Records.

It is Paris' second praise and worship album since her 1991 Dove Award winning album Sanctuary. The album is more contemporary than Sanctuary, whereas that album was more ethereal and tranquil. Perennial is a combination of hymns and original songs, including a re-recording of her Kingdom Seekers track "Faithful Men." The album peaked at number five on the Billboard Top Christian Albums chart. A concert video was released on VHS called Perennial In Concert: A Season of Worship featuring Paris accompanied by an orchestra performing songs from Perennial. Paris was nominated in two categories at the 30th GMA Dove Awards for Inspirational Album of the Year and Long-Form Video of the Year.

Track listing

Personnel 
 Twila Paris – lead vocals, backing vocals (6)
 Shane Keister – acoustic piano, harmonium, additional keyboards 
 Joey Miskulin – accordion (9)
 Tom Hemby – acoustic guitar, mandolin
 Biff Watson – additional acoustic guitar (3, 4)
 Mark Baldwin – additional acoustic guitar (6), gut-string guitar (9)
 Ron Block – additional acoustic guitar (9)
 Leland Sklar – bass
 Steve Brewster – drums, percussion 
 Eric Darken – percussion (6, 9)
 John Mock – tin whistle (2, 6)
 Hunter Lee – Uilleann pipes (6)
 Tom Howard – orchestra arrangements, choir arrangements 
 Gavyn Wright – concertmaster 
 The London Session Orchestra – orchestra 
 Dale Warland Singers – backing vocals (1, 3, 5, 7, 10)
 Angel Voices – boys choir (2, 3, 10)
 Robert Prizeman – choir director (2, 3, 10)
 Dan Tyminski – backing vocals (4, 9)

Pre-Production Track Arrangements
 Brown Bannister, Tom Howard, Shane Keister and Twila Paris

Production
 Peter York – executive producer 
 Brown Bannister – producer 
 Steve Bishir – recording, mixing 
 Ben Georgiades – recording assistant 
 Hank Nirider – recording assistant, overdub recording, additional engineer, mix assistant 
 Craig Thorsen – recording assistant
 Gary Paczosa – overdub recording, additional engineer 
 Shane D. Wilson – overdub recording, additional engineer 
 Preston Smith – recording for Dale Warland Singers
 Rupert Coulson – orchestra and boy choir recording 
 Doug Sax – mastering at The Mastering Lab (Hollywood, California)
 Christiév Carothers – creative direction 
 Jan Cook – art direction 
 Sarah Watson – design 
 Andrew Eccles – photography

Companion book 
Paris has also released a companion book called Perennial: Meditations for the Seasons of Life with her sisters Starla with the co-writing and Angie with the illustrations, published by Zondervan Publishing. Paris and Starla share sixty meditations on gardening, recipes and life's lessons, arranged by the four seasons.

Charts

References 

1998 albums
Twila Paris albums
Sparrow Records albums
Albums produced by Brown Bannister